Spunky is a studio album released by Monty Alexander in 1965 on Pacific Jazz LP record ST-20094 (stereo) and PJ-10094 (mono).

Track listing

Personnel

 Monty Alexander: piano (all tracks)
 Victor Gaskin: bass (all but 4, 6)
 Paul Humphrey: drums (all but 4, 6)
 Bob Cranshaw: bass (tracks 4, 6)
 Bruno Carr: drums (tracks 4, 6)
 Gene Bertoncini: guitar (tracks 4, 6)
 Scott Turner: guitar (track 9)

References

1965 albums
Monty Alexander albums
Pacific Jazz Records albums